Richard Gordon Smith (1858 – 6 November 1918) was a British traveler, sportsman, and naturalist who traveled extensively in the late 19th century and lived in Japan for a number of years.

Life
Richard Gordon Smith was an English gentleman, naturalist, and sportsman who enjoyed traveling abroad, visiting France, Norway, and Canada in his early years. Richard's father was John Bridson Smith, the youngest in a family of nine children, and his mother was Annie Lawrence of Cheltenham. It was from her family that he acquired his interest in sporting pursuits.

After being married for 18 years, he could no longer tolerate living with his wife, so he left home and took up world travel. He must have been a man of some means because he traveled first class, keeping a series of eight large leather-bound diaries in which he recorded his experiences. He called these his "Ill-Spelled Diaries", and they are full of idiosyncratic and chauvinistic observations of things he encountered, his impressions of Japan, the Russo-Japanese War, and the daily life of the people. They included illustrations and mementoes from around the world. He journeyed to the Far East, visiting Ceylon and Burma. He arrived in Japan on Christmas Eve 1897, and he remained there until February 1900, when he set off to return to England via New Guinea and Fiji. However, he became ill and abandoned the journey, returning to Japan instead. In 1903 and again in 1905 he did travel to England, visiting China, Singapore, and Ceylon on his way. He returned to Kyoto at the end of 1905 where he continued transcribing folktales and myths and filling his diaries with his observations. He also collected animals and plants, which he sent to the British Museum. Many of these were new to science and were named in his honour.

In 1908, he published Ancient Tales and Folklore of Japan, but it was not greeted with much interest in Britain. In the preface he states: 

By 1910 his financial circumstances were deteriorating, and his wife was asking for a legal separation. He suffered from beriberi and malaria and his health continued to worsen. The last entry in his diary was made in September 1915. He died on the 6 November 1918, and an obituary was published in the Japanese "Weekly Chronicle".

He was awarded the Fourth Order of the Rising Sun in Japan.

Works
 Ancient Tales and Folklore of Japan
 Travels in the Land of the Gods: The Japan Diaries of Richard Gordon Smith

Species linked to Smith
 Aglaia smithii
 Ahnfeltiopsis smithii
 Anas smithii (Cape shoveler)
 Bathyraja smithii (African softnose skate)
 Chodsigoa smithii (Smith's shrew)
 Crocidura smithii (Desert musk shrew)
 Spirobranchus smithii (Many spined climbing perch)
 Cypripedium smithii
 Damburneya smithii
 Dendropanax alberti-smithii
 Durio wyatt-smithii
 Eospalax smithii (Smith's zokor)
 Euphorbia smithii
 Ficus albert-smithii (Figueira-do-alberto)
 Gekko smithii (Smith's green-eyed gecko)
 Geophaps smithii (Partridge pigeon)
 Herpestes smithii (Ruddy mongoose)
 Hirundo smithii (Wire-tailed swallow)
 Hopea wyattsmithii
 Kerivoula smithii (Smith's woolly bat)
 Leptocharias smithii (Barbeled houndshark)
 Lissonycteris smithii (Angolan fruit bat)
 Megalogomphus smithii
 Myodes smithii (Smith's red-backed vole)
 Pangshura smithii (Brown roofed turtle)
 Pisonia donnellsmithii (Cagalero)
 Podocarpus smithii
 Pouteria austin-smithii
 Procordulia smithii
 Rotala smithii
 Stygobromus smithi (Alabama well amphipod)
 Syagrus smithii
 Synodontis smithii (Shield-head catfish)
 Tlalocohyla smithii
 Trachypithecus smithii (Dusky leaf-monkey)

References

External links
 Ancient Tales and Folklore of Japan. Google Books.
 Two Japanese Hermit Tales.
 Ancient Tales and Folk-Lore of Japan E-book.
 

English naturalists
1858 births
1918 deaths